Teretia oligocaenica is an extinct species of sea snail, a marine gastropod mollusk in the family Raphitomidae.

Description

Distribution
Fossils of this marine species were found in Upper Oligocene strata in Aquitaine, France.

References

 Lozouet P. (2017). Les Conoidea de l'Oligocène supérieur (Chattien) du bassin de l'Adour (Sud-Ouest de la France). Cossmanniana. 19: 3–180.

oligocaenica
Gastropods described in 2017